Zürich Giesshübel is a railway station in the west of the Swiss city of Zürich, in the city's Alt-Wiedikon quarter. The station is on the Sihltal line which is operated by the Sihltal Zürich Uetliberg Bahn (SZU). Trains on the same company's Uetliberg line pass by the station without stopping, instead serving the nearby Zürich Binz station.

The station is served by the following passenger trains:

References

External links 
 

Giesshubel